The Gray-Kincaid House is a historic house in rural White County, Arkansas. It is a single-story wood-frame structure, with a side gable roof and board and batten siding. A shed-roof extension extends across the southern facade, while the principal (north-facing) facade has an entry near its center and four sash windows. A stone chimney rises from the eastern end. The house was built as a traditional dogtrot in about 1910, with an attached rear ell, but the latter was destroyed in a storm in the 1940s, and the dogtrot breezeway has been enclosed, transforming the house into center-hall plan structure.

The house was listed on the National Register of Historic Places in 1992.

See also
National Register of Historic Places listings in White County, Arkansas

References

Houses on the National Register of Historic Places in Arkansas
Houses completed in 1910
Houses in White County, Arkansas
National Register of Historic Places in White County, Arkansas